Catching Killers is a true crime docuseries produced by Simon Dekker and Diana Sole Walko, released on Netflix on November 4, 2021. The series follows police and prosecutors as they investigate, arrest and convict the world's most violent killers. 


Summary 
Each episode focuses on some infamous serial killer cases, from the detectives' perspectives. The investigators tell their own struggles, mistakes and efforts to catch the elusive perpetrators, and how did it affected their lives (both personal and career).

Episodes

Season 1 (2021)

Season 2 (2022)

References

External links 
 

True crime television series
2021 American television series debuts
Documentary television series about crime in the United States
English-language Netflix original programming
Netflix original documentary television series

Television series about serial killers
Non-fiction works about serial killers